The 1974 Melia Trophy, also known as the Madrid Open, was a combined men's and women's tennis tournament played on outdoor clay courts at the Real Sociedad Hípica Española Club de Campo in Madrid, Spain. The men's tournament was classified as Group A category and was part of the 1974 Grand Prix circuit. It was the third edition of the tournament and was held from 7 October until 13 October 1974. Ilie Năstase and Helga Masthoff won the singles titles.

Finals

Men's singles
 Ilie Năstase defeated  Björn Borg 6–4, 5–7, 6–2, 4–6, 6–4

Women's singles
 Helga Masthoff defeated  Tine Zwaan 6–2, 6–4

Men's doubles
 Patrice Dominguez /  Antonio Muñoz defeated  Brian Gottfried /  Raúl Ramírez 6–1, 6–3

Women's doubles
 Lesley Charles /  Sue Mappin defeated  Cora Creytd /  Helga Masthoff 6–2, ret.

Mixed doubles
 Virginia Ruzici /  Ion Țiriac defeated  Mark Farrell /  Lesley Charles 7–6, 4–6, 6–3

References

External links
 ITF tournament edition details

Madrid Tennis Grand Prix
Madrid Tennis Grand Prix
Madrid Tennis Grand Prix